The 2nd FINA Synchronized Swimming World Cup was held 1985 in Indianapolis, USA. It featured swimmers from 3 nations, swimming in three events: Solo, Duet and Team.

Participating nations
3 nations swam at the 1985 Synchro World Cup:

Results

Point standings

References

FINA Synchronized Swimming World Cup
Synchronized swimming competitions in the United States
International aquatics competitions hosted by the United States
Swimming competitions in Indiana
1985 in synchronized swimming
1985 in American sports
1985 in sports in Indiana
1980s in Indianapolis